The Beretta 1301 is a gas-operated semi-automatic shotgun produced by Beretta Italy and imported by Beretta USA in the United States. The firearm has two separate designs.  One is intended for tactical, self-defense, and law enforcement applications, whereas the other is designed for competitive disciplines. Despite its intended applications, it is often used by a minority of hunters and sporting clay shooters. 

The 1301 is a successor to the 1201 Tactical model, and it shares many similarities with Beretta's A400 line of shotguns, which are successors to the A391 series.

All modern 1301 shotguns, much like their A400 counterparts, make use of a Beretta proprietary choke constriction system known as "Optima-HP". One exception is the early tactical model, which used a fixed cylinder constriction barrel. These barrels are backbored for reduced muzzle rise and improved patterning.

Models

1301 Tactical 
The Beretta 1301 Tactical is the successor to the 1201, and began production in Italy in 2014. It is designed solely for tactical applications, encompassing law enforcement and civilian defense. It is often viewed as a competitor to the M4 Super 90 manufactured by Benelli, a subsidiary of Beretta.  In recent years, it has seen small modifications, and new variants are entering the market. As of November 18, 2020 there are four variants. 1301 Tactical Black, 1301 Tactical FDE, 1301 Tactical OD Green, 1301 Tactical Marine.

1301 Tactical Pistol Grip LE 
The 1301 Tactical Pistol Grip LE is Beretta’s new gas operated semi-automatic shotgun designed for law enforcement and home defense. Right out of the box, the 1301 Tactical Pistol Grip LE features an oversized charging handle, large textured bolt release, and an oversized reversible safety button. The integrated BLINK gas operating system, featuring a cross tube gas piston, allows the 1301 Tactical to cycle 36% faster than any other shotgun on the market. Available in an 18.5” barrel configuration, the 1301 Tactical features a robust, protected sighting system that uses a ghost ring for the rear sight and an interchangeable front blade sight. The receiver offers a MIL-STD-1913 Picatinny rail. The pistol-grip Stock features an adjustable cheek piece, a LimbSaver® recoil pad and offers multiple sling attachment points.

1301 Competition 
The Beretta 1301 Competition is designed for competitive shooting disciplines, most frequently 3-gun competitive shooting.  The shotgun makes use of a traditional bead sight system, and boasts a longer barrel, conducive to shooting targets at greater distances.

1301 Comp Pro 
The 1301 Comp Pro includes a new polymeric stock with the Kick-Off Plus system consisting of two elastomer dampeners complete with return springs, positioned near the rubber insert, which effectively mitigate the first recoil peak reducing the perceived recoil by up to 40%. A third elastomer dampener, located in the stock bolt, absorbs the impact of the slide against the stock, thus reducing the second recoil peak, muzzle jump and any vibrations caused by the movement of the slide.

The B-Steady system divides the stock into two sections: Butt and forearm. The recoil absorption point is in an advanced position, moving in unison with the forearm, which is free to move back leaving the butt stable and avoiding any annoying rubbing of the comb against the cheek. The cheek remains still and rests perfectly without ever losing the line of fire.

Langdon Tactical LTT 1301 
Langdon Tactical Technologies of Gilbert, Arizona makes the LTT 1301 Tactical Shotgun, a Title 18 USC 922r-compliant variant using a Gen 2 Beretta 1301 barreled action, fitted with a modified Magpul "Zhukov" aftermarket handguard that offers M-LOK rail mount options, a Magpul SGA buttstock for Mossberg 500/590 with an Aridus ASA-1301 Adapter, QDC sling mounting point options and a 7-round tubular magazine. There are also the options to add an Aridus Universal Q-DC sidesaddle shell holder and an Aridus CROM (Co-witness Ready Optic Mount) for Trijicon RMR or Aimpoint Micro series red dot sights.

Characteristics 
All Beretta 1301 shotguns use cold-hammer-forged barrels with chrome-lining and parkerized external finishes.  The frames or "receivers" are made from aluminum with an anodized finish.  The stock and forearm are made from polymer, with a rubberized recoil pad fastened to the rear of the stock.

While the barrel lengths differ, the barrel chambers are each capable of accommodating up to 3" shotgun shells.  Despite this, the Competition receiver is designed around 3.5" configuration, whereas the Tactical is designed on a 3" receiver.  As a result, the barrels are model specific, but neither will fire a shotshell greater than 3" in length.

With a limiter installed in to the shotgun's magazine, the user may load either one or two rounds in to the tube, or a total of four with the limiter removed.  This may be coupled with a fifth round loaded in to the chamber, for a maximum total of five rounds.

Models sold in other countries may include a magazine extension, with a 6+1 capacity.  However, models manufactured with these tubes are not permitted for sale in many countries, including the United States, due to international restrictions governing the export of firearm related components. If a consumer wishes to extend the magazine on a capacity restricted model, they may rely on aftermarket tube manufacturers.

References 

Semi-automatic shotguns of Italy
Beretta firearms